José Manuel Quitongo (born 18 November 1974) is an Angolan footballer. A winger, he spent the majority of his playing career in Scotland, where he made 61 appearances in the Scottish Premier League for Heart of Midlothian, St Mirren and Kilmarnock, scoring five goals. Known as a journeyman due to the number of clubs he has represented, Quitongo featured prominently for Hamilton Academical in three separate stints with the side. In five seasons with Hamilton, he scored 15 goals in 95 Scottish Football League appearances.

Having left Angola when he was ten-years-old, Quitongo went on to play in Portugal, Republic of Ireland, Sweden, England, the United Arab Emirates, Italy and Scotland.

Career
Born in Luanda in Portuguese Angola, Quitongo began his career in Portugal with Benfica, playing 20 games, during his time at Benfica he played alongside Portuguese legends Rui Costa and Nuno Gomes before moving to Darlington. He made just one appearance for Darlington before moving to Hamilton Academical in November 1995.

In October 1997 Quitongo moved to Hearts, playing 30 league games (mostly as substitute) before returning to Hamilton in January 2000. He moved to St Mirren in July 2000, making 57 league appearances before signing for Kilmarnock in August 2002. He made just nine appearances before leaving the club. After spells playing for Dibba Al-Hisn in the United Arab Emirates, he signed to Hamilton for a third time in October 2003, where he remained until the summer of 2004. He signed for League of Ireland club Waterford United for the remainder of the 2004 season.

In January 2005, he signed for Alloa Athletic, moving to Partick Thistle in March 2006. However, he made just one appearance, as a substitute, for Thistle before being released at the end of the season.

In April 2006 Quitongo was called up to the senior Angola squad. However, he missed out on selection for the 2006 FIFA World Cup. In August 2006 he signed for Dumbarton after playing in two games as a trialist, but made only three substitute appearances before leaving in June 2007.

In September 2007, Quitongo joined Livingston, but made only two substitute appearances before signing for Stenhousemuir in November. After being released by the club at the end of the 2007–08 season, Quitongo joined Junior club Glenafton Athletic at the start of 2009–10, but left the club in May 2010.

After a spell out of the professional game where he ran his own football academy in Blantyre, Quitongo was appointed player-manager of Muirkirk Juniors in December 2013. He left the club in October 2014. He signed for amateur Sunday team Budhill United in September 2016.

Personal life
His sons Jai and Rico are both footballers.

References

1974 births
Living people
Footballers from Luanda
Angolan footballers
Association football wingers
S.L. Benfica footballers
G.D. Estoril Praia players
Waterford F.C. players
MD FF Köping players
Darlington F.C. players
Hamilton Academical F.C. players
Heart of Midlothian F.C. players
St Mirren F.C. players
Kilmarnock F.C. players
Dibba Al-Hisn Sports Club players
Alloa Athletic F.C. players
Albion Rovers F.C. players
Partick Thistle F.C. players
Dumbarton F.C. players
Livingston F.C. players
Stenhousemuir F.C. players
Glenafton Athletic F.C. players
Pollok F.C. players
Lesmahagow F.C. players
Muirkirk Juniors F.C. players
League of Ireland players
English Football League players
Scottish Football League players
Scottish Premier League players
Scottish Junior Football Association players
Angolan expatriate footballers
Expatriate footballers in Portugal
Expatriate footballers in Sweden
Expatriate association footballers in the Republic of Ireland
Expatriate footballers in England
Expatriate footballers in Scotland
Angolan football managers
Expatriate football managers in Scotland
UAE First Division League players
Primeira Liga players
Angolan expatriate sportspeople in Portugal
Angolan expatriate sportspeople in Italy
Angolan expatriate sportspeople in the United Kingdom